Mary Chubb (22 March 1903 – 22 January 2003) was a British writer and archaeologist. She has been described as "the first professional excavation administrator". She was the daughter of John Burland Chubb (1861–1955), A.R.I.B.A., and a descendant  the Bridgwater artist John Chubb (artist),  1746–1818.

Career

Archaeology
Chubb has been described as an "accidental archaeologist". She took as job at the Egypt Exploration Society (EES) to fund her study of sculpture at the Central School of Art in London, and not because she had an interest in archaeology or Egyptology. After a year as the under-secretary at the EES's London base, doing odd jobs as the secretary refused to pass any real work onto her, she felt like quitting. Having been sent into the basement to look for a drawing that was to be included in one of the Society's publications, she found an object that would trigger her interest in archaeology, something that the previous twelve months of work had not. She described this moment in her book Nefertiti Lived Here:

Chubb left her under-secretary job at the Egypt Exploration Society and volunteered herself as a "secretarial dogsbody" to their excavation of Tell el-Amarna in Egypt. She slowly developed skills and became an important member of the team. Her administrative work "helped to set new standards in archaeological publication". After the end of the dig at Amarna, she joined the excavations in Iraq, at Ur and Eshnunna, run by the Oriental Institute of the University of Chicago; she held the tile "Field Secretary to the Iraq Expedition of the Oriental Institute". She then spent 1938 at the University of Chicago writing up their recent excavations.

Author
After returning to England during World War II, Chubb was involved in an accident that would end her archaeological career. She was hit by a military lorry while riding a bicycle and was seriously injured; she survived the crash but lost her leg and lived the rest of her life physically disabled. In 1942, while recuperating from her injury, she realised it would stop her from attending any more archaeological excavation, and so she turned her talent to writing.

Chubb wrote a number of books on archaeology for the general public and also wrote a number of children's books on people of the ancient world. She also branched out into journalism, writing for magazines such Punch and for the BBC. Her children's book were in the form of alphabet books in which each letter was a word linked to the book's topic and a paragraph followed that explained the word; e.g., in her An Alphabet of Ancient Egypt, the letter C was for Cartouches and this was followed by a basic explanation of how to read hieroglyphics. Her two main books were published in the 1950s; Nefertiti Lived Here (1954) and City in the Sand (1957). These books are about her involvement in the 1930s excavations of Tell el-Amarna in Egypt, and of Ur and Eshnunna in Iraq. They were republished in the 1990s with new introductions and added epilogues.

She curated her family's archive of the art and papers of her ancestor, the Bridgwater artist John Chubb (artist), (1746 - 1816), and wrote two articles about it in The Countryman. The collection was sold to the Blake Museum, Bridgwater, in 2004.

Selected works

 Autobiographical
 
 
 
 

 Children's books

References

1903 births
2003 deaths
British archaeologists
British women archaeologists
20th-century British writers
British amputees
Alumni of the Central School of Art and Design
20th-century British women writers
20th-century archaeologists
Scientists with disabilities